Yaddlethorpe is a district in the south of Scunthorpe, North Lincolnshire, England. It is close to the M180 and next to Bottesford, divided by the A159 road. Yaddlethorpe is in the DN17 postcode area.

Community
The local secondary school is Frederick Gough School on Grange Lane South. Leys Farm Junior School is on Park Avenue. Enderby Road Infants School, despite its name, is on Sunningdale Road.

Local public houses include the Black Beauty on Keddington Road and the Dolphin on Messingham Road.

Local stores are Co-op on Willoughby Road, and Asda on Burringham Road.

External links
 Leys Farm Junior School

Villages in the Borough of North Lincolnshire
Scunthorpe